Maurizio Brusadelli (born 30 May 1968) is an Italian businessman and the former President of Mondelez International Cadbury in the UK and Ireland.. He is now EVP & President Asia Pacific, Middle East and Africa for Mondelez International and part of the company Executive Team.

Early life
He was born in Gravedona in the north of Italy and the Lombardy region in the Province of Como. He studied Business and Economics at Bocconi University (Università commerciale Luigi Bocconi) in Milan.

Career
He started his career in 1993 in Milan in Kraft Foods. He became a senior manager in Italy in 2002.

Cadbury
He became President of Mondelez Intl (former Cadbury) in the UK on 1 October 2012. Mondelez Cadbury UK is based in Uxbridge. He was promoted President of Markets & Sales Asia Pacific, based in Singapore in September 2014. In January 2016 he has been appointed to the position of EVP & President Asia Pacific. He increased his responsibility during 2016 adding Middle East and Africa countries to his Asia Pacific remit. He is part of Mondelez executive team.

References

1968 births
Bocconi University alumni
Businesspeople in confectionery
Italian chief executives
People from the Province of Como
Living people